Myelobia is a genus of moths of the family Crambidae.

Species
Myelobia atrosparsellus (Walker, 1863)
Myelobia bimaculata (Box, 1931)
Myelobia biumbrata (Schaus, 1922)
Myelobia castrellus (Schaus, 1922)
Myelobia decolorata Herrich-Schäffer, [1854]
Myelobia dorsipunctellus (Schaus, 1922)
Myelobia endothermalis (Hampson, 1919)
Myelobia heinrichi (Box, 1931)
Myelobia incanella (Hampson, 1896)
Myelobia lanceolatus (Zeller, 1881)
Myelobia nabalalis (Schaus, 1934)
Myelobia nigristigmellus (Hampson, 1896)
Myelobia parnahyba (Schaus, 1934)
Myelobia smerintha (Hübner, 1821)
Myelobia spectabilis (C. Felder, R. Felder & Rogenhofer, 1875)
Myelobia squamata (Hampson, 1919)
Myelobia systrapegus (Dyar, 1913)
Myelobia vinasella (Schaus, 1913)
Myelobia zeuzeroides Walker, 1865

References

Crambidae genus list at Butterflies and Moths of the World of the Natural History Museum

Chiloini
Crambidae genera
Taxa named by Gottlieb August Wilhelm Herrich-Schäffer